Nolensville High School is a high school in Nolensville, Tennessee. It opened in 2016 with grades 9–10, adding a junior class in 2017 and a senior class in Fall 2018. The school is located in northeastern Williamson County in the expanding town of Nolensville.

Administration 
Former Brentwood Middle School principal Bill Harlin was the founding principal of Nolensville High School and held that position until 2021. He was succeeded in the 2021-22 school year by Amy Maffei, who is the current principal. The school has three assistant principals: Ellen Brown, Bryant Gunter, and Clarissa Haymon.

Athletics 
The school participates in all TSSAA-sanctioned sports: baseball, basketball, bowling, cross country, football, golf, soccer, softball, tennis, track and field, volleyball, and wrestling. The girls' volleyball team won the state championship in 2019, 2020, and 2021. The school also has two state champion runner-up titles: 2019 girls' soccer and 2019 wrestling.

References

Public high schools in Tennessee